Keykavus (also Romanized as Keykāvūs, Kai Kāūs, Keikavoos, and Keykāvos; also known as Keykāvūs-e Bālā and Kni Kāūs) is a village in Dodangeh Rural District, in the Central District of Behbahan County, Khuzestan Province, Iran. At the 2006 census, its population was 446, in 87 families.

References 

Populated places in Behbahan County